The Línjì school is a school of Chan Buddhism named after Linji Yixuan (d. 866). It took prominence in Song China (960–1279), spread to Japan as the Rinzai school and influenced the nine mountain schools of Korean Seon.

History

Song dynasty
Before the Song dynasty, the Linji school was rather obscure and very little is known about its early history.

Five Dynasties and Ten Kingdoms Period (907–960/979 CE)
The Five Dynasties and Ten Kingdoms period (907–960/979 CE) was an era of political upheaval between the fall of the Tang dynasty and the founding of the Song. During this period, five dynasties quickly succeeded one another in the north, and more than twelve independent states were established, of which only ten are traditionally listed.

This division into various regions and kingdoms led to a diversification of Chan factions, reflected in the Five Houses of Chán. The Fayan school was especially influential in the Southern Tang (937-975) and Wuyue (907-978). It propagated jiaochan yizhi, "harmony between Chan and the Teaching", in opposition to jiaowai biechuan, "a special transmission outside the teaching", the latter eventually becoming one of the defining slogans of Chan.

Northern Song Dynasty (960–1127)
The Song was a ruling dynasty between 960 and 1279. It is divided into two distinct periods: Northern and Southern Song.

During the Northern Song (960–1127), the Song capital was in the northern city of Bianjing (now Kaifeng) and the dynasty controlled most of China proper. The Fayan school was the first faction to gain recognition at the Song court, due to the influence of the buddhist scholar-official Zanning (919–1001). After his death this position was taken over by the Linji school.

The Linji school brought together the classical elements of Chan Buddhism:
 The denlu-genre, the "Transmission of the Lamp";
 The yulu-genre, the recorded sayings of the masters of the Tang;
 The gongan collections, describing dialogues and interactions between masters and students, supplemented with introductions, commentary and poetry;
 The Hua Tou practice, the meditative concentration on the "word-head" of a gongan as an aid in attaining jiànxìng;
 The notion of "a special transmission outside the scripture" as one of the defining characteristics of Zen.

All of these elements, which shaped the picture of the iconoclastic Zen-master who transmits a wordless truth, were shaped by and dependent on literary  products that shaped the Traditional Zen Narrative which furthered the position of the Linji-school. It is possible that this narrative does not describe the actual Chan-practice, of the Song-Dynasty, nor of the Tang Dynasty.

Linji
The Linji-school became the dominant school within Chan at the beginning of the Song due to support from literati and the court. The figure of Linji, as one of the exemplary masters of Chan, was detailed in a series of writings in the tenth and eleventh century, which supported the Linji school and contributed to its influence and standing.

Zutang ji (952)
The first mention of Linji is in the Zutang ji (祖堂集 "Anthology of the Patriarchal Hall), compiled in 952, 86 years after Linji's death. The Zutang ji was written to support the Xuefeng Yicun lineage. It pictures this lineage as heir to the legacy of Mazu and the Hongzhou school. It was written by two students of Zhaoqing Wendeng (884-972), a dharma descendant of Xuefeng Yicun, whose lineage was traced back to Shitou Xiqian (700-790). Xuefeng's student Yunmen Wenyan (862 or 864–949 CE) established the Yunmen school, while Xuefeng's "grand-disciple" Fayan Wenyi  established the Fayan school.

Jingde Chuangdeng lu (1004)
The Transmission of the Lamp (景德傳燈錄), compiled in 1004 by Daoyuan, is one of the essential Chan writings. It was compiled by a member of the Fayan school, but published after editorial revision by Yang Yi (974-1020), a leading Song literati figure, and a supporter of the Linji faction at the Song court. The Fayang school still has prominence among the competing factions which are portrayed in the Chuangdeng lu, but the growing influence of the Linji-faction is emerging in this document.

The Transmission of the Lamp first gives brief biographical information on Lijni, followed by Linji's interactions with Hunagbo, to strengthen the claim of Linji's descendancy form Hunagbo and the Mazu-lineage.

The Transmission of the Lamp served several needs and interests:
 The needs of the Song to use Buddhism in centralizing the new state, and maintain good relations with neighboring Buddhist nations;
 The interests of the Linji-faction, which was dominant around the capital city Bianjing;
 The wish of the new dynasty to establish its own cultural style (wen);
 The needs of literati, who were supporting a cultural style which endorsed free, spontaneous expression, different from a more traditional "ancient culture" (guwen).

The convergence of these influences led to the creation of the image of the iconoclastic Chan-master, who fulfilled all these requirements:

Nevertheless, this picture deviates from what is believed to be the character of many of the Chan-masters from earlier times, who were fairly conventional: "they routinely accepted invitations to court, received purple robes and honorary titles, and had monasteries built for them by rulers and officials".

Tiansheng Guangdeng lu (1029)
According to Welter, the real founder of the Linji school was Shoushan (or Baoying) Shengnian (首山省念)(926-993), a fourth generation dharma-heir of Linji. The Tiansheng-Era Expanded Lamp Record (天聖廣燈錄), compiled by the official Li Zunxu (李遵勗)(988-1038) confirms the status of Shoushan Shengnian, but also pictures Linji as a major Chan patriarch and heir to the Hongzhou school of Mazu Daoyi, displacing the prominence of the Fayan lineage. It also established the slogan of "a special transmission outside the teaching", supporting the Linji-school claim of "Chan as separate from and superior to all other Buddhist teachings".

Linji's teachings are already more or less completed in this document, and he is pictured as the dharma-heir of Huangbo Xiyun (d.850). The Guangdeng lu contains brief biographical details on the life and actions of Linji.

The main elements of classical Chan are fully displayed in the Tiansheng Era Expanded Lamp Record: encounter dialogue, enlightenment verses, the sayings of the masters and the commentaries upon these sayings, the lack of historical contextualization and biographical detail.

Sijia Yulu (1066–1069)
The Sijia yulu "Discourse Records of the Four Masters", compiled 1066–1069 by Huanglong Huinan (1002–1069), contains the discourse records of Mazu Daoyi (709–788), Baizhang Huaihai (720–814), Huangbo Xiyun (d.850) and Linji, the major patriarchs of the Tang Dynasty according to the Linji faction. In this text, Linji is explicitly placed in line with these teachers of the Hongzhou school.

Chan orthodoxy was still not settled by this time. At around the same time the Deshan Sijia lu was compiled, a comparable text containing the records of Deshan Xuanjian (780–865), whose lineage was traced back to Shitou Xiqian, and included the Chan-branch of Xuefeng Yicun, Yumen and Fayan. Other Sijia lu included the Huanglong Sijia (compiled 1141) and the Ciming Sijia lu (compiled 1153).

Zhenzhou Linji Huizhao Chansi yulu (1120)
The Zhenzhou Linji Huizhao Chansi yulu ("The record of Linji"), compiled by Yuanjue Zongan in 1120, is the classic version of the record of Linji. Yuanjue Zongan belonged to the Yunmen-faction, and also re-issued the Yunmen yulu, the "Discourse Records of Yunmen".

The separate publication of Linji's records signals the newly acquired status of Linji as one of Chan's major patriarchs. It also reflects the changing identity of Chan during the Song Dynasty, and the growing status of yulu-texts.

The text of Linji's record is the same as in the Tiansheng Guangdeng lu, but in a different order. The Linji yulu opens with lectures given by Ljnji at the request of the prefect Governor and other officials, highlighting the close connection of the Linji-faction with the court. The biographical data on Linji's life are expanded, and appear at the end of the text.

In the Linji yulu the phrase "a special transmission outside the scriptures" is ascribed to Linji himself. It served as a leading slogan for the establishment of the Linji Chan identity by the Linji-faction of Shoushan Shengnian, and was seen as trademark of the Linji Chan identity by Yang Yi and Li Zunxu, the court-related literati who had an essential role in the construction of Linji's record and reputation.

Southern Song Dynasty (1127–1279)
The Southern Song (1127–1279) refers to the period after the Song lost control of northern China to the Jin dynasty. During this time, the Song court retreated south of the Yangtze and established their capital at Lin'an (now Hangzhou). The principal figures of the Linji-school also moved to the south.

Dahui and the hua-tou practice
During the 12th century, a clear difference between the Linji and the Caodong schools emerged. The two schools were competing for support of the literati, who became more powerful when the Song-government started to limit her influence on society. Hongzhi Zhengjue (1091–1157) of the Caodong-school emphasized silent illumination or shikantaza as a means for solitary practice, which could be undertaken by lay-followers. Dahui Zonggao (1089–1163) introduced kanhua practice, "observing the word-head", as a means of solitary practice. He organized the study of koans into a system, which was exported to Japan in this period.

Yuan Dynasty (1279–1368)
The Yuan Dynasty was the empire established by Kublai Khan, the leader of the Mongol clan of the Borjigin, after the Mongol Empire conquered the Jin and the Southern Song. Chan teachings started to be mixed with Pure Land Buddhism, as in the teachings of Zhongfeng Mingben (1263-1323).

Ming dynasty (1368–1644)
Chan Buddhism enjoyed something of a revival in the Ming dynasty with teachers such as Hanshan Deqing (憨山德清), who wrote and taught extensively on both Chan and Pure Land Buddhism; Miyun Yuanwu (密雲圓悟), who came to be seen posthumously as the first patriarch of the Ōbaku Zen school; as well as Yunqi Zhuhong (雲棲祩宏, 1535—1615) and Ouyi Zhixu (蕅益智旭).

Chan was taught alongside Pure Land Buddhism in many Chinese Buddhist monasteries. In time much of the distinction between them was lost, and many masters taught both Chan and Pure Land.

With the downfall of the Ming, several Chinese Chan masters fled to Japan, founding the Ōbaku school.

Qing Dynasty (1644–1912)
The Qing dynasty was the last imperial dynasty of China.

At the beginning of the Qing, Chan was "reinvented" by the "revival of beating and shouting practices" by Miyun Yuanwu (1566–1642), and the publication of the Wudeng yantong ("The strict transmission of the five Chan schools") by Feiyin Tongrong’s (1593–1662), a dharma heir of Miyun Yuanwu. The book placed self-proclaimed Chan monks without proper Dharma transmission in the category of "lineage unknown" (sifa weixiang), thereby excluding several prominent Caodong monks.

Modern times (after 1912)

After further centuries of decline during the Qing, Chan was revived again in the early 20th century by Xuyun, a well-known figure of 20th-century Chinese Buddhism. Many Chan teachers today trace their lineage back to Xuyun, including Sheng-yen (聖嚴, Shèngyán) and Hsuan Hua (宣化, Xuānhuà), who have propagated Chan in the West where it has grown steadily through the 20th and 21st century.

Chan was repressed in China during the recent modern era in the early periods of the People's Republic, but has more recently been re-asserting itself on the mainland, and has a significant following in Taiwan and Hong Kong as well as among Overseas Chinese.

Influence

Japan

The Japanese Zen sect known as the Rinzai school is a branch of the lineage Linji founded. The smaller Japanese Ōbaku school came to Japan in the 17th century as a separate Linji lineage and existed in Japan for many years as a culturally Ming Dynasty Chinese Zen within Japan.

Later the Ōbaku semi-merged into the Rinzai lineage after Hakuin Ekaku's revival of Rinzai in the 18th century. Today the Rinzai and Obaku schools are closely related.

The now-defunct Fuke-shū also had close ties to the Rinzai school and claimed affiliation with the Linji lineage.

Korea
The Linji school had a considerable influence on the already existing Korean Jogye Order, the name adopted by the nine mountain schools, which were established by students of Mazu Daoyi. Jinul (知訥) (1158-1210) took over the Hua Tou practice of Dahui, but mixed it with the intellectual teachings of Guifeng Zongmi (780–841). Jinul emphasized sudden insight, to be followed by gradual cultivation.

See also
 Mazu Daoyi
 Linji Yixuan
 Zen lineage charts
 Five Houses of Chán
 Caodong school
 Rinzai school
 Zazen
 Koan

Notes

References

Sources
Printed sources

 
 
 
 
 
 
 
 
 
 
 
 
 
 
 

Web sources

External links
 The record of Linji. Translation by Ruth Fuller Sasaki, and introduction by Yanagida Seizan

Linji school